Horst Walter (July 2, 1939 – July 22, 2015) was a German footballer.

He died in Dresden on July 22, 2015.

References

External links
List of DDR internationals

1939 births
2015 deaths
German footballers
East German footballers
East Germany international footballers
Dresdner SC players
Hallescher FC players
Dynamo Dresden players
Dynamo Dresden II players
Association football midfielders
People from Mittelsachsen
Footballers from Saxony
People from the Kingdom of Saxony
People from Bezirk Karl-Marx-Stadt